Comendador is a title of Portuguese and Spanish origin, given to a person responsible for a comenda (Portuguese) or encomienda (Spanish).

Comendador may also refer to:

Comendador, Elías Piña, the capital of the Elías Piña province of the Dominican Republic
Comendador Gomes, a municipality in the Brazilian state of Minas Gerais
Comendador Ho Yin Garden, a garden located in a residential area in former Portuguese colony of Macau.
Comendador Levy Gasparian, a municipality located in the Brazilian state of Rio de Janeiro